Hugh O'Sullivan (born 24 February 1998) is an Irish rugby union player, currently playing for London Irish. He plays as a scrum-half and can also cover all positions in the back three. He attended Belvedere College, where he was part of back-to-back Leinster Schools Rugby Senior Cup winning sides in 2016 and 2017, only the third time the school had achieved such a feat in its history. He primarily played fullback for the 2017 winning team, but has since played mainly at scrum-half.

Leinster
O'Sullivan entered the Leinster Rugby academy ahead of the 2017–18 season. He made his senior debut at the start of the 2018–19 season, featuring off the bench against the Dragons.

Ireland
O'Sullivan represented the Ireland U-20s at the 2018 Six Nations Under 20s Championship and at the 2018 World Rugby Under 20 Championship. Ireland finished third in the Six Nations, despite losing three of five matches. Ireland then struggled badly at the June World Championship, finishing in their worst ever position of 11th out of 12 competitors and narrowly avoiding relegation to the World Rugby Under 20 Trophy.

References

External links
Leinster Profile
Pro14 Profile

1998 births
Living people
People educated at Belvedere College
Rugby union players from County Meath
Irish rugby union players
Clontarf FC players
Leinster Rugby players
Rugby union scrum-halves
London Irish players